The 1981 Season's Cup became the second edition of Season's Cup, an annual football match contested by the winners of the previous season's Soviet Top League and Soviet Cup competitions.

The match was played at the Stadion Lokomotiv, Simferopol, on 17 March 1981, and contested by league winner Dinamo Kiev and cup winner Shakhter Donetsk. Shakhter Donetsk won it on penalty shootout.

Match

Details

See also
 Klasychne derby

1981
1981 in Soviet football
FC Dynamo Kyiv matches
FC Shakhtar Donetsk matches
Sport in Simferopol
March 1981 sports events in Europe